Gary Fahey is a former Gaelic footballer who captained the Galway county team in the All-Ireland Senior Football Championship. Playing primarily in a full-back position, he won five Connacht Senior medals and two All-Ireland medals. Fahey is the brother of Niamh, the Republic of Ireland women's national football team player.

Playing career

College
Fahey won a Sigerson Cup with UCG, defeating Queen's in the 1992 final.

Inter-county
Fahey's inter-county career began in 1992 when he joined the Galway panel after playing a role in UCG's Sigerson Cup-winning team. Fahey made his inter-county debut in the summer of 1992 when he came on as a substitute in a defeat against Mayo in Castlebar. It wasn't until 1995 All-Ireland Senior Football Championship that Galway finally won the Connacht title under Bosco McDermott. They defeated Mayo in Tuam Stadium: their first provincial title in 8 years. Galway later lost to Tyrone in the All-Ireland semi-final.

Mayo defeated Galway in both the 1996 and 1997 Connacht campaigns where they also lost both subsequent All-Ireland finals. John O'Mahony was brought in as Galway manager in September 1997, and coached a team which had Fahy as a "central cog".

In the 1998 All-Ireland Senior Football Championship final, the team defeated Kildare in the All-Ireland final. It was Galway's first All-Ireland win in 32 years. Their 1–13 to 2–06 win was the catalyst for a strong season for Galway, who followed up with victories over Leitrim, Roscommon in the Connacht final and Derry in the semi-final.

In the next four years, Fahey would play in some of the biggest games in Galway's history. In 1999, a hamstring injury kept him out of the Connacht Final. He returned for the 2000 All-Ireland Senior Football Championship season where Galway re-claimed the Connacht title after defeating Leitrim before losing to Kerry in the All-Ireland Final after a replay.

Galway began the 2001 championship season with a defeat to Roscommon. However, through the new 'back-door' system, and following victories over Wicklow, Cork, Armagh, Roscommon (again) and Derry, they met Meath in the All-Ireland final. Galway beat Meath in the final by nine points, and Fahey collected his second All-Ireland medal. He also lifted the Sam Maguire trophy as captain.

Galway won the Connacht title again in both the 2002 championship and 2003 competition.

John O'Mahony departed in 2004 and Fahey retired from inter-county football shortly afterwards.

References

External links
GAA profile

Year of birth missing (living people)
Living people
All-Ireland-winning captains (football)
Alumni of the University of Galway
Gaelic football backs
Galway inter-county Gaelic footballers
Killannin Gaelic footballers
University of Galway Gaelic footballers
Winners of two All-Ireland medals (Gaelic football)